

Calling formats

00              International Direct Dialing code

List of area codes in Melilla

References
Melilla dialing codes - accessed 3 May 2010.

Melilla
Telecommunications in Spain
Telephone numbers